2018 in 100 metres lists the World Best Year Performance in the year 2018 in both the men's and the women's 100 metres.

Records

Men top 60

Women top 60

See also
 2019 in 100 metres

References

External links
 

2018
100 metres Year Ranking, 2018